Kourounios is a mountain village in the municipal unit Gortyna, southwestern Arcadia, Greece. It is situated in the eastern foothills of mount Lykaion, overlooking the Alfeios valley. It is 2 km west of Mavria, 3 km north of Isoma Karyon, 4 km south of Karytaina and 11 km northwest of Megalopoli. In 2011 Kourounios had a population of 33.

History 
The village is first mentioned in 1302, and the remains of the Frankish castle of Saint George in Skorta are located nearby. On 27/28 March 1821, during the first days of the Greek War of Independence, Greeks under Theodoros Kolokotronis ambushed and defeated a Turkish force in the gorge west of the village. Among the historical buildings of the area are the ruins of the village of Xirokarytaina (Ξηροκαρύταινα) and of the so-called "Burned Mosque" (Καμένο Τζαμί), as well as the chapel of Psili Panagia, built in 1870.

Population

See also
List of settlements in Arcadia

References

External links
History and Information about Kourounios
 Kourounios on the GTP Travel Pages

Gortyna, Arcadia
Populated places in Arcadia, Peloponnese